Francis Edgar Awaritefe (born 18 April 1964) is a former professional football (soccer) player. Born in England, he made three appearances for the Australia scoring once. He was Director of Football at Melbourne Victory.

Early life
Awaritefe was born in London, England.

Administrative career
On 21 June 2011, he was signed by Melbourne Victory as their new Director of Football on a two-year deal, replacing Gary Cole, with Mehmet Durakovic signed as the club's new manager on the same day.

However, after a brief five-month stint in his job as the Director of Football with Melbourne Victory, Awaritefe was axed by Melbourne Victory, after a run of poor results.

He appeared on the Australian television program Nerds FC.

Awaritefe is as at February 2019 vice-president of FIFPro (International Federation of Professional Footballers) and has been with Craig Foster participating in the campaign to free Hakeem al-Araibi.

References

External links
 
 Oz Football profile
 The World Game – SBS

1964 births
Australia international soccer players
Australian soccer players
National Soccer League (Australia) players
Barnet F.C. players
Living people
Melbourne Knights FC players
North Geelong Warriors FC players
Naturalised citizens of Australia
Footballers from Greater London
South Melbourne FC players
Sutton United F.C. players
Sydney United 58 FC players
Wimbledon F.C. players
Marconi Stallions FC players
Australian people of Nigerian descent
English people of Nigerian descent
Tooting & Mitcham United F.C. players
English emigrants to Australia
Association football forwards
Melbourne Victory FC directors of football
Black British sportspeople